The Sanremo Music Festival 1973 was the 23rd annual Sanremo Music Festival, held at the Casinò Municipale in Sanremo, province of Imperia between 8 and 10 March 1973. The final night was broadcast by Rai 1, while the first two nights were broadcast live only by radio. The 23rd edition of Sanremo Music Festival is the first to be broadcast in color.

The show was presented by  Mike Bongiorno, assisted by Gabriella Farinon. Vittorio Salvetti served as artistic director.  
  
The winner of the Festival was Peppino di Capri with the song "Un grande amore e niente più".

Participants and results

References

Notes

Sanremo Music Festival by year
1973 in Italian music
1973 music festivals